Farsara is the area of Dalkhola Municipality in Ward no.9 and 16. in Uttar Dinajpur District West Bengal

History 

Farasara lies on the border of Bihar and Bengal. Before 2000, it looked like a village, but by 2010, it had developed into a commercial center.

Transport 

A tempo stand was established in 2005. It provides transport to the nearby gram panchayats in Bihar.
And here roads name is NH.34-2 some time later it will meet to Barsoi  in Katihar district.

Schools 
These schools are in Farsara:

 Dalkhola Urdu High School (jr)
 Farsara FP School
 Sishu Siksha Mandir

Geography 
Farasara has 7 major localities:

 Farasara
 Railway Colony
 Shantinagar
 Loknathpara
 PWD Para
 Karbala
 Colony
loknath para

References 

Uttar Dinajpur district